Beibuschbach is a small river of Bavaria, Germany. It flows into the Laufach in the village Laufach.

See also
List of rivers of Bavaria

Rivers of Bavaria
Rivers of the Spessart
Rivers of Germany